Oakland High School (OHS) is a public high school that belongs to the Oakland School District. It is the only high school in the city of Oakland, Oregon, United States.

Academics
In 2008, 80% of the school's seniors received a high school diploma. Of 40 students, 32 graduated, three dropped out, two received a modified diploma, and three were still in high school the following year.

Athletics and Extracurriculars
Oakland's boys' basketball team won state championships in 2000 2006, and 2013. The 2013 team consisted of seniors Colton Reber, Logan O'Hara, Connor Dolan, Austin Collins, and Jordan Bailey; juniors Toby Blum, Michael Yard, Zack VanDeHey, Jeb Harper, Joey Dixon-Magnus, Austin Nix, and Austin Baimbridge; and sophomores Roy Benzel and Hayden Snow.

Oakland High School's highschool band won first-place for the 1A-2A state band contests in both 2018 and 2022.

OHS' football team won the 2022-2023 state championship, having previously won it in 2011.

Notable alumni
 Brandon Ash - NASCAR driver
 Tim Freeman - politician

References

External links 
 https://www.edline.net/pages/OaklandHS

High schools in Douglas County, Oregon
Public high schools in Oregon